Marc Crousillat (17 January 1960 – 22 January 2022) was a French water polo player. He competed in the men's tournament at the 1988 Summer Olympics. He died in Marseille on 22 January 2022, at the age of 62.

References

External links
 

1960 births
2022 deaths
French male water polo players
Olympic water polo players of France
Water polo players at the 1988 Summer Olympics
Water polo players from Marseille